Nassima el Hor is a Moroccan television presenter, one of the best-known for over 25 years.

El Hor hosted Frankly Speaking and Clearly for 2M TV, two groundbreaking shows that discussed censorship and democracy in Moroccan society.

She devised the show A White Thread (Al Kkayt Al Abyad) and has been presenting it since it started in April 2009. The title refers to a Moroccan proverb about a mediator using such a thread to bring enemies together. On the show, people bring their private differences into the open and el Hor attempts a public reconciliation, assisted by a psychologist and a lawyer. 
She explains that the show is needed to fill a gap as the individualism of modern living has swept away the traditions whereby differences would be solved in a communal way, in the souk or with neighbours.

References

Year of birth missing (living people)
Living people
Berber Moroccans
Moroccan television presenters
Moroccan women television presenters
Moroccan television personalities
People from Casablanca